The 1978 Miami Hurricanes football team represented the University of Miami as an independent during the 1978 NCAA Division I-A football season. Led by Lou Saban in his second and final year as head coach, the Hurricanes played their home games at the Miami Orange Bowl in Miami, Florida. Miami finished the season with a record of 6–5.

Schedule

Personnel

Season summary

at Colorado

Florida State

References

Miami
Miami Hurricanes football seasons
Miami Hurricanes football